Omero Bonoli (17 September 1909 – 17 October 1985) was an Italian artistic gymnast who competed in the 1932 Summer Olympics. He was born in Ravenna. In 1932 he won the silver medal in the pommel horse competition.

References

External links
 
 Italian Olympians BONO-BONZ 

1909 births
1985 deaths
Italian male artistic gymnasts
Olympic gymnasts of Italy
Gymnasts at the 1932 Summer Olympics
Olympic silver medalists for Italy
Olympic medalists in gymnastics
Medalists at the 1932 Summer Olympics